George Gordon (May 2, 1865 – February 3, 1942) was a Canadian politician. He represented the riding of Nipissing in the House of Commons of Canada from 1908 to 1911. He was then appointed to the Senate, where he served until his death in 1942. He was a member of the Conservative Party.

Biography 
He was born in Pakenham, Canada West (Pakenham, Ontario), the son of Alexander Gordon and Elizabeth Fraser, and was educated in Pembroke. In 1894, he married Alice Emma Perry. Before entering politics, Gordon was a lumber merchant in Sturgeon Falls and was head of several lumber companies. He also served as a director of the Bank of Nova Scotia. Gordon ran unsuccessfully for a seat in the House of Commons in 1904 defeated by Liberal C A  McCool.  Gordon defeated McCool in 1908 and was 
reelected to the House of Commons in 1911 but resigned his seat to allow Francis Cochrane to run for election in Nipissing. Gordon died in Toronto at the age of 76.

References 

1865 births
1942 deaths
Canadian senators from Ontario
Conservative Party of Canada (1867–1942) MPs
Conservative Party of Canada (1867–1942) senators
Members of the House of Commons of Canada from Ontario